"Dynamite" is a song recorded by South Korean boy band BTS, released on August 21, 2020, through Big Hit Entertainment and Sony Music Entertainment. It is the band's first song fully recorded in English. The song, written by David Stewart and Jessica Agombar and produced by Stewart, is an upbeat disco-pop song with elements of funk, soul, and bubblegum pop, and takes influence from 1970s music—it features snapping handclaps, echoing synths, and celebratory horns.

Intended to soothe listeners during the COVID-19 pandemic, the song talks about joy and appreciation for the little things that make life valuable. Upon release, "Dynamite" received positive reviews from music critics, with praise towards its catchiness and broadly appealing retro sound. It garnered the band their first Grammy nomination, for Best Pop Duo/Group Performance at 63rd Annual Grammy Awards, making them the first Korean pop act to be nominated for one.

"Dynamite" experienced large amounts of commercial success worldwide; it debuted at number one on the Billboard Hot 100 chart, becoming the band's first number-one single in the United States and making BTS the first all-South Korean act to top the Hot 100. The song sold 265,000 downloads in its first week, marking the biggest pure sales week since Taylor Swift's "Look What You Made Me Do" (2017). "Dynamite" stayed atop the Hot 100 for three total weeks. On Spotify, "Dynamite" debuted with 7.778 million streams, marking the biggest opening day for a song in 2020. Additionally, "Dynamite" peaked at number one on both the Billboard Global 200 and Billboard Global Excl. U.S. charts, topping the latter for three consecutive weeks. The song peaked within the top ten of the charts in 25 countries, including Australia, Canada, and the United Kingdom, and topped the charts in Hungary, Israel, Lithuania, Malaysia, Singapore, and South Korea. The accompanying music video reached 1 billion views on April 12, 2021.

Initially a standalone single, "Dynamite" was later included on BTS' fifth Korean-language album, Be (2020), released on November 20.

Recording
"Dynamite" is one of the few songs to which the members did not contribute in songwriting or production. In interviews with multiple media outlets, writers David Stewart and Jessica Agombar explained the song's creation. Through their publisher Tim Blacksmith at Stellar Songs, they learned that BTS was searching for an English language single. The duo wrote three songs over Zoom calls "at the start of lockdown." Stewart and Agombar wanted to create a song which is "energetic, fun, hopeful, positive and just like a huge ball of energy." Agombar disclosed how the song was conceived:
 Stellar Songs sent the track to Columbia's CEO Ron Perry and Big Hit in early April. BTS initially chose another song, before taking "Dynamite" two weeks later. The songs lyrics were tweaked alongside Jenna Andrews to make them more PG friendly. Stewart told E! Online that the group and labels "wanted to make sure it was quite neutral and not offensive" and that "There was a couple of rap references that might've been a bit more just like in your face and a bit more like, you know, ballsy that wasn't quite right for them". The song was ultimately recorded in mid-July.

Composition and lyrics
"Dynamite" is a 1970s-influenced disco-pop song with elements of funk, soul and bubblegum pop. The song was composed in  common time in the key of C minor with a tempo of 114 beats per minute. Constructed in verse-chorus form, the verses follows the chord progression Cm–Fm7–B7sus–E, while the choruses follows a Dm-Gm7–F sequence. BTS' vocal range span from B3 to D5. Instrumentation was provided by Stewart, who played drums, percussion, bass guitar, synth bass, synthesizers, pads, piano, electric guitars, programmed horns and programmed strings, and Johnny Thirkell, who played live horns. The upbeat production consists of "snapping" handclaps, bounces, grooves and "infectious" beats. The track features a funky bassline accompanied by vocal harmonies, falsetto hooks and a disco rhythm that is "ready-made for the dancefloor." It utilises "layered vocals, echo-y synth, and celebratory horns" to recreate the '70s retro sound.

The song opens with a snippet of the chorus, where Jungkook sings, "'Cause I, I, I'm in the stars tonight/ So watch me bring the fire and set the night alight." Percussion and bass is added in the next section. It further builds with Nile Rodgers-esque guitar that is later boosted by "vibrant" brass sound. The chorus is "unifying" and gains speed as the song progresses. Craig Jenkins of Vulture compared the horns in the chorus to that of Neon Genesis Evangelions theme song, "A Cruel Angel's Thesis" (1995) and described "Dynamite" as "a vehicle expressly designed to break through the stratosphere", noting its similarity in genre to the handful of other disco-influenced songs that reached number one on the US Billboard Hot 100 earlier that year (namely Doja Cat's "Say So", Harry Styles' "Watermelon Sugar", and Lady Gaga and Ariana Grande's "Rain on Me"). Pitchforks Noah Yoo compared the song musically to Taio Cruz's 2010 song of the same name. The last two verses of the track introduce a change in the key. Speaking about the meaning of the song in a press conference, Suga stated that "Dynamite" has a "message of confidence and happiness. It's like after you fell on the ground, you're trying to get back up again. That's what this song is like." In an interview with Zane Lowe of Apple Music, RM said the song is "made of positive vibes, energy, hope, love, the purity, everything." Lyrically, the song talks about the joy and appreciation of little things that makes life valuable. The lyrics also include several pop cultural references including, King Kong, The Rolling Stones and basketball star LeBron James. Alyssa Bailey of Elle interpreted the lyrics as "a much-needed burst of joy and invitation to join them, dance, and be a light, even when the world seems a little dark".

Release
On July 26, 2020, the band confirmed during a live stream on V Live that they would be releasing an English-language song on August 21, 2020, as the first single for their upcoming album. Discussing the song, which was one of their most heavily promoted releases thus far, the band said that "due to COVID-19, people around the world have been going through tough times and we wanted to share some positive energy with our fans". One day after the news, a website displaying seven countdowns went live, each one corresponding to a new announcement for the single. On July 31, the group shared a pre-save link for Spotify. On August 2, Big Hit revealed that the title of the song would be "Dynamite". The following day, pre-orders went live for 7-inch and cassette editions of the song, as well as the digital single and its instrumental for US customers; the physical versions sold out within an hour. The next day, the band shared a promotion schedule revealing two music video releases, three interviews with American networks and a performance at the 2020 MTV Video Music Awards. EDM and acoustic remixes were released on August 24. Additional tropical and poolside remixes were released on August 28. Four new remixes of the song, "Slow Jam", "Midnight", "Retro", and "Bedroom", were released simultaneously on September 18. A special "Holiday Remix" version of the single was released on December 11 as a thank-you to fans for their support of the song and its achievements.

Critical reception
"Dynamite" was met with mostly positive reviews from music critics upon release, with emphasis on its catchiness and broadly appealing retro sound. The New York Times included the song in their playlist of thirteen songs of its release week, with music critic Jon Caramanica writing that although it was "less musically adventurous than the songs that made the group a worldwide phenomenon, it relies on brightness, exuberance and relentless good cheer." He further likened its musical style to the works of Jamiroquai and Charlie Puth. Mike Wass of Idolator deemed the track "a stone-cold smash" with "one of the catchiest choruses of 2020." Yoo felt that the song "yearns to fit the Western pop music canon while also slyly sending it up." He praised the beat as "polished" and the hook as "memorable" in which "each member gets a moment to shine." He also compared the track to Bruno Mars' "Uptown Funk" (2014) and labelled it as "a self-aware pop song that's about nothing but itself." Similarly, Jenkins found the track's "cute, catchy, unassuming mass entertainment" akin to "Uptown Funk" and Katy Perry's songs from her 2010 album, Teenage Dream. Reviewing for the Los Angeles Times, Laura Zornosa opined that the song is "soaked in color and nostalgia" and acclaimed it for having "all the ingredients for a summer success" by fusing "the novelty of 'Old Town Road' with the international flair of 'I Like It' and 'Despacito' and all the sunny hype of 'Can't Stop the Feeling!'" She also dubbed the chorus as an "earworm" and the lyrics as "relatable." Tim Chan of Rolling Stone regarded it as "bright and breezy" track which he felt was "one of the poppiest songs the group has released to date" and praised the song for its sound, production, "uplifting" chorus and commercial appeal. The publication later included the song on its 2021 revised list of the 500 Greatest Songs of All Time at number 346, and called it "a landmark, hegemony-shattering moment for the world-conquering group".

Patrick Hosken of MTV praised the track and wrote, "the song itself is a blockbuster, not because it's overstuffed with ideas but because it's light and airy and, crucially, feels like summer." Rhian Daly of NME stated the song "mines the bright, infectious sounds of disco to get its joyful energy across, sticking to the genre's tradition of serving as a form of escapism when life gets hard." Tom Breihan from Stereogum praised the sound and regarded the song as "classic boy-band pop." Aamina Khan of Vogue compared it to their previous single "Boy with Luv" (2019) and praised the pop sound calling it "a welcome summer wind-down." Robin Murray of Clash cited it as an "up-front return" and highlighted the "glossy" production, adding that it "showcases each member's ability, bringing it all together as a seamless whole." Billboards Jason Lipshutz described it as "an effervescent piece of pop" that is "filled with radio-friendly highlights." He was impressed by the "late key change" and the "sing-along bridge," and called the song "one of its biggest hits to date." P. Claire Dodson of Teen Vogue regarded the track as a "lighthearted, energetic pop that proves yet again the dexterity they possess with sound and aesthetic" which was "precisely for that energy" and viewed it as "a shift from the overall arc" of their previous album, Map of the Soul: 7. Similarly, Marty Rosenbaum from Radio.com praised the instant appeal of the song and called it "explosive." Douglas Greenwood of i-D magazine also enjoyed the single and listed it as one of the best songs of its release week. Ellie Bate of BuzzFeed called the song "upbeat, poppy, full of rainbow colors and sweetness" and "an undeniably happy and upbeat disco track, with both lyrics and choreography paying homage to musical legends like the Rolling Stones, Michael Jackson, and Elvis Presley."

Music video
The music video for "Dynamite" was preceded by a 28-second long video teaser which was published to Big Hit's official YouTube channel on August 18. The short clip showed scenes of the band in pastel-colored clothes with a sunset sky behind them, as well as them dancing to a "cheerful disco melody" in retro-styled outfits against the backdrop of a large "Disco" sign. The audio featured a "funky bass line and horns" and showcased the song's "upbeat" and "boundless" energy.

On August 20, a live countdown started at 11:30 PM EST on Big Hit's YouTube channel, half an hour before the music video's release. When the video premiered at 12:00 AM EST, it garnered over 3 million peak concurrent viewers, surpassing previous record holder Blackpink's 1.66 million concurrents for "How You Like That" in June, and setting a new all-time record for the biggest music video premiere on the platform. It became the fastest YouTube video to reach 10 million views, after only 20 minutes of release, and the most viewed YouTube video in the first 24 hours, earning 101.1 million views and setting three new Guinness World Records. The music video is the fastest in YouTube history to cross the 200 million mark, in just four days and twelve hours after release, and the fastest by a music group to surpass 400 million views, doing so on September 26, 35 days after release. It is the fastest music video by both a group and an Asian act to achieve 500 million views—59 days after release—and the fastest by a Korean artist to cross 600 million views, doing so on November 16 in just under 27 days of its exceeding the former milestone. On December 17, "Dynamite" surpassed 700 million views, achieving the mark in under four months. It became the fastest music video by a Korean group to achieve 800–900 million views, when it crossed the former five months after release in January 2021, and the latter 40 days later. The video is BTS' fastest to reach 1 billion views—on April 12, 2021, in just under eight months—and their third, after "DNA" and "Boy with Luv". It is also the fastest by a Korean artist to do so.

A B-side version of the music video, filmed on the same set as the original "but with different angles and a few amusing bloopers", was released on August 24 and showed "[BTS] having fun together in joyful vibes". A choreography only version of the original music video premiered during online video game Fortnites Battle Royale on September 25—a "BTS Dynamite Pack" featuring two emotes with moves like the band was made available for in-game purchase from September 23, two days prior to the event. This version crossed 100 million views on January 30, 2021, becoming BTS' 29th music video to do so and further extending the band's record as the Korean artist with the most music videos exceeding 100 million views.

Commercial performance 
"Dynamite" debuted at number six on the Gaon Digital Chart in South Korea, with two days of tracking. The following week, it rose to the top spot, making it BTS' seventh number one in the country, and the second in 2020 after "On". The song remained at the top position for seven consecutive weeks, tying with Zico's "Any Song" for the longest running number one song on the chart. On the chart issue dated October 31, "Dynamite" regained its number one spot and remained at the top spot for a further three weeks, tallying a total of 11 non-consecutive weeks atop the chart. The song also topped the component download and streaming charts, spending 11 weeks atop the latter. "Dynamite" was the best-performing song of September and October 2020 in South Korea, based on digital sales, streaming, and background music (instrumental track) downloads. In Japan, the song debuted at number seven on the Billboard Japan Hot 100, peaking at number two, three weeks after. The song reached number one on Billboard Japan's Streaming Songs chart on the issue dated September 7, 2020, with over 10 million streams. In its 11th week, the song surpassed 100 million cumulative streams, becoming the fastest song in history to do so and only the second song by a foreign artist in Japan besides Ed Sheeran's "Shape of You" (2016). The song exceeded 250,000 downloads in 2021 and was awarded platinum certification by the Recording Industry Association of Japan (RIAJ) that February. On the UK Singles Chart, "Dynamite" debuted at number three, representing the band's most successful single in the territory, surpassing the peak of "Boy with Luv" (2019) at number 13. In January 2021, OCC reported that "Dynamite" was the 15th best-selling song of 2020 in the UK.

United States 
In the United States, "Dynamite" debuted atop the Billboard Hot 100, becoming BTS' first number-one single in the US and their fourth top-10 entry. The group became the first all-South Korean act in Hot 100 history to debut at number one and the first Asian act to chart a number-one song in the country since Kyu Sakamoto with "Sukiyaki" in 1963. The song sold 300,000 units in its first week, including downloads and physical—vinyl and cassette—versions. It earned 33.9 million total US on-demand streams and 11.6 million radio impressions. "Dynamite" also debuted atop the Billboard Digital Song Sales chart, selling 265,000 downloads and marking the biggest pure sales week since "Look What You Made Me Do" by Taylor Swift launched with 353,000 downloads in 2017. Supported by subsequent "Poolside", "Tropical", EDM, and acoustic remixes, as well as an instrumental version, "Dynamite" sold a further 182,000 units in its second week and remained atop the Hot 100. It became the 20th song, of 43 that have entered the chart at number one, to debut at number one and spend its first two weeks atop the chart since a mid-90's rules change allowed songs to debut at number one; it is the first song by a group to accomplish this since Aerosmith's "I Don't Want to Miss a Thing" in 1998. In its fifth week on the chart, "Dynamite" returned to the top spot the Hot 100 for a third week at number-one, aided by its "Bedroom," "Midnight," "Retro" and "Slow Jam" remixes, which together accounted for 52% of the overall song sales of 153,000 copies that week. "Dynamite" entered the Pop Songs chart at number 30 on the issue dated August 29, 2020, becoming the band's sixth entry on the ranking. On the week of November 7, it reached the ninth position, becoming their first top ten on the chart, and also the highest-charting song by a Korean act, besting Psy's "Gangnam Style" (2012). In January 2021, Billboard announced that "Dynamite" was the number one selling single in the US of 2020, and the only song to exceed 1 million downloads. It sold a total of 1.3 million copies across all formats according to Nielsen Music's annual year-end report. The margin was so significant that it surpassed the second best-selling song, "Blinding Lights" by The Weeknd, which sold 580,000 copies, by more than a 2.2x multiple.

Following the 63rd Annual Grammy Awards on March 14, 2021, Billboard reported a surge in sales of all songs performed on the show for that day. "Dynamite" sold an additional 10,500 copies—a 2,748% increase—and was the top-selling track of the night. The song returned to number one on the Digital Songs chart for that week and the next—its 15th and 16th non-consecutive weeks in the lead—with 27,880 and 26,700 copies sold respectively, tying with "Old Town Road" by Lil Nas X in week 16 for the second most weeks atop the ranking. The single became BTS' fourth to achieve platinum status in the US, but their first to receive double-platinum certification from the Recording Industry Association of America (RIAA), doing so on March 17. On March 29, "Dynamite" tied "Despacito"s record for the most weeks at number one on the Digital Songs chart, when it topped the issue dated April 3 for a record-extending 17th week with 43,000 copies sold. On the Hot 100 issue of the same date, the single spent its 31st consecutive week inside the top 50, tying with "Gangnam Style" as the longest-charting songs by a Korean artist there. The following week, Dynamite became both the longest-running number one on the Digital Songs chart and the longest-charting song by a Korean artist on the Hot 100 respectively, when it spent its 18th non-consecutive week atop the former, with over 37,600 copies sold and its 32nd week on the latter, on the issues dated April 10, 2021.

Worldwide 
With 7.778 million first-day streams globally, "Dynamite" surpassed Taylor Swift's "Cardigan" (7.742 million streams) as the biggest song debut of 2020 on Spotify. During the inaugural week of the Billboard Global 200 which tracks the most streamed and digitally sold songs in over 200 territories, and the Billboard Global Excl. U.S. which tracks the same metrics excluding the US, "Dynamite" launched at number two on both the charts, blocked from reaching the top spot by Cardi B's "WAP" and Maluma's "Hawai", respectively. The following week, the song climbed to number one on the Global Excl. U.S. chart with 67.4 million streams and 18,000 downloads sold in territories outside the US. In its third week, "Dynamite" reached number one on the Global 200 chart with 92.1 million global streams and 58,000 global downloads sold, becoming the most-streamed and most-sold song globally. The single topped the Global Excl. U.S. chart for a second consecutive week, becoming the first song to top both charts simultaneously. It spent a record four and eight weeks on top of the Global 200 and Global Excl. U.S. charts respectively.

In March 2021, the International Federation of the Phonographic Industry (IFPI) published its annual top-10 charts for the previous year and listed "Dynamite" as the 10th best-selling digital single of 2020 globally, having amassed 1.28 billion subscription stream equivalents worldwide in less than five months.

Live performances 
BTS first performed "Dynamite" at the 2020 MTV Video Music Awards on August 30, 2020. They followed that up with additional performances on the Today Show on September 10, America's Got Talent on September 16, and as the closing act at the iHeartRadio Music Festival on September 18—the band opened their four-song set with the track. BTS made their first ever appearance on NPRs Tiny Desk Concerts on September 21, also opening their three-song set with "Dynamite". During the first of the band's week-long stint on NBC's The Tonight Show Starring Jimmy Fallon that began on September 28, BTS presented a pre-recorded performance of the song that featured both Jimmy Fallon and the Roots. They performed it from Terminal 2 of Incheon International Airport for the 2020 Billboard Music Awards in October, at the Seoul Olympic Stadium for the 2020 American Music Awards in November, and as the closer for their appearance on MTV Unplugged in February 2021. In March 2021, they performed "Dynamite" from the roof of a skyscraper in Seoul for the 63rd Annual Grammy Awards, becoming the first Korean pop act to perform their own song at the Grammys.

Track listing

7-inch
 "Dynamite" – 3:19

Cassette
A-side
 "Dynamite" – 3:19
B-side
 "Dynamite" – 3:19

CD
 "Dynamite" 3:19 
 "Dynamite" (Instrumental)3:18
 "Dynamite" (Acoustic Remix)3:17
 "Dynamite" (EDM Remix)3:18
 "Dynamite" (Tropical Remix)3:17
 "Dynamite" (Poolside Remix)3:03
 "Dynamite" (Slow Jam Remix)3:19
 "Dynamite" (Midnight Remix)3:16
 "Dynamite" (Bedroom Remix)3:27
 "Dynamite" (Retro Remix)3:28

Digital
 "Dynamite" – 3:19
 "Dynamite" (Instrumental) – 3:18

Digital EP (Extended)
 "Dynamite" 3:19
 "Dynamite" (Instrumental)3:18
 "Dynamite" (Acoustic Remix)3:17
 "Dynamite" (EDM Remix)3:18

Digital EP (DayTime Version)
 "Dynamite" 3:19
 "Dynamite" (Instrumental)3:18
 "Dynamite" (Acoustic Remix)3:17
 "Dynamite" (EDM Remix)3:18
 "Dynamite" (Tropical Remix)3:17
 "Dynamite" (Poolside Remix)3:03

Digital EP (NightTime Version)
 "Dynamite" 3:19
 "Dynamite" (Instrumental)3:18
 "Dynamite" (Slow Jam Remix)3:19
 "Dynamite" (Midnight Remix)3:16
 "Dynamite" (Retro Remix)3:28
 "Dynamite" (Bedroom Remix)3:27

Digital single (Holiday Remix)
 "Dynamite" (Holiday Remix)3:33

Credits and personnel
Credits adapted from Tidal and NetEase Music.

 BTS primary vocals
 David Stewart  production, songwriting, drums, percussion, bass guitar, synth bass, synths, pads, piano, electric guitars, programmed horns, programmed strings, background vocals
 Jessica Agombar songwriting
 Johnny Thirkell live horns
 Pdogg recording engineering
 Jenna Andrews vocal production
 Juan "Saucy" Peña vocal engineering
 Serban Ghenea mix engineering 
 John Hanes assistant mix engineering
 Chris Gehringer mastering

Charts

Weekly charts

Monthly charts

Year-end charts

Weekly charts (Holiday Remix)

Accolades
At the 63rd Annual Grammy Awards, "Dynamite" garnered BTS their first-ever Grammy nomination for Best Pop Duo/Group Performance—the band is the first K-pop act to be recognized by the Recording Academy. The song won five consecutive weekly Melon Popularity awards from September 9–28, and also achieved a record 32 music show wins in South Korea.

Certifications and sales

Release history

Legacy
To test the experimental system of the “space Internet”, Danuri (Korea Pathfinder Lunar Orbiter) successfully forwarded a number of photos taken, as well as several video files, including, BTS' "Dynamite" from outer space to Earth at Korea's Ministry of Science and ICT, Korea Aerospace Research Institute (KARI), and the Electronics and Telecommunications Research Institute (ETRI) on November 7, 2022.

Cover versions 
American a cappella group Pentatonix performed a cover of the song in a mash-up released on August 17, 2021, which also included "Butter".

See also 

 List of airplay number-one hits in Argentina
 List of Billboard Argentina Hot 100 top-ten singles in 2020
 List of Billboard Digital Song Sales number ones of 2020
 List of Billboard Digital Song Sales number ones of 2021
 List of Billboard Global 200 number ones of 2020
 List of Billboard Global 200 number ones of 2021
 List of Billboard Hot 100 number ones of 2020
 List of Billboard Hot 100 number-one singles of the 2020s
 List of Billboard Hot 100 top-ten singles in 2020
 List of Gaon Digital Chart number ones of 2020
 List of Inkigayo Chart winners (2020)
 List of most-liked YouTube videos
 List of most-viewed online videos in the first 24 hours
 List of Music Bank Chart winners (2020)
 List of Music Bank Chart winners (2021)
 List of number-one digital songs of 2020 (Canada)
 List of number-one songs of 2020 (Malaysia)
 List of number-one songs of 2020 (Singapore)
 List of Show! Music Core Chart winners (2020)
 List of top 10 singles in 2020 (Australia)
 List of top 10 singles in 2020 (Ireland)
 List of UK top-ten singles in 2020
 List of UK Independent Singles Chart number ones of 2020

References

2020 songs
2020 singles
BTS songs
Billboard Hot 100 number-one singles
Columbia Records singles
English-language South Korean songs
Number-one singles in Malaysia
Number-one singles in Singapore
Sony Music singles
Number-one singles in Israel
Gaon Digital Chart number-one singles
Billboard Korea K-Pop number-one singles
Disco songs
Bubblegum pop songs
Hybe Corporation singles
Billboard Global 200 number-one singles
Billboard Global Excl. U.S. number-one singles